Central New Mexico Correctional Facility is a state-operated adult prison in Los Lunas, Valencia County, New Mexico.  The facility was opened in 1980, as a medium security prison with 480 beds, but today features both minimum and maximum security units.

As of 2005, the facility had a population of 1,110 inmates. CNMCF is operated by the New Mexico Corrections Department.

References 

Prisons in New Mexico
1980 establishments in New Mexico